Quietdrive is an alternative rock band based in Hopkins, Minnesota, USA, that was formed in 2002. Quietdrive released their first album, When All That's Left Is You, on May 30, 2006, on Epic Records. In April 2008, Quietdrive left Epic Records and released an album titled Deliverance on October 14, 2008, with the Militia Group. In 2009, they left Militia Group and released an independent EP titled Close Your Eyes on their own record label, Sneaker 2 Bombs Records. Their third full-length album, Quietdrive, was released on December 14, 2010, and a full-length album, Up or Down, on April 24, 2012.  The Ghost of What You Used to Be was released on December 16, 2014.

History
The original members of the band attended Armstrong High School in Plymouth, Minnesota and in ninth grade, Brandon Lanier started telling Droo Hastings that he was a great drummer  and that they should start a band with him and his friend Justin Bonhiver. Initially, the band was a trio with Hastings as lead singer and bass guitar, Lanier playing drums, and Bonhiver on guitar. The band posted an audition for a lead singer on MP3.com. Kevin Truckenmiller entered the band after submitting his solo work, including an early incarnation of the song "I Go Both Ways", which was named after their friend, Jennings Lane. Matt Kirby began attending Saint John's University with Truckenmiller. The group eventually joined together and formed in 2002 under the name "Sneaker 2 Bombs," a hard rock band which reflected the evolving Minneapolis local music scene.

Quietdrive initially built a following at The Garage in Burnsville, Minnesota. The band pursued music venues in Minneapolis but found better connection with younger crowds and stayed between suburban and city clubs. As Quietdrive, the band recorded demo songs with Eric Trelstad.  These songs were heard by Will.I.Am from Black Eyed Peas during a visit to Minneapolis recording studio IPR.  Will arranged for the band to retain attorney Peter Lewitt and to showcase in Los Angeles but executives from Interscope passed on signing the band.  Afterwards, Truckenmiller began strongly to consider reorganizing the band with inclusion of Matt Kirby.  By April 2004, Kirby was officially made a band member and Sneaker2bombs began live performances in local bars including The Lodge.   Truckenmiller and Kirby also performed as an acoustic duo at the graduation night for Holy Angels Academy High School in June 2004.

The band put Sneaker2bombs recordings on music industry mp3 sites and Chris Foitle, an intern at Epic Records in Santa Monica, began contacting Bonhiver and Truckenmiller.  In July 2004, Epic arranged to see the band perform in Minneapolis with the assistance of Greg Sheldon.  Pete Giberga, a Vice President of A&R at Epic's Santa Monica's office, flew in and decided to sign the band.  Giberga was familiar with Sui Generis, a young emo act from Apple Valley who Giberga unsuccessfully pursued for Epic in 2003.  In early August 2004, Giberga contacted attorney Lewitt and offered a deal memo binding Quietdrive to Epic.  Truckenmiller consented.   Over the next four months, the band sought advice from industry veterans including Danny Nozell, and emerged with the decision to dismiss Lewitt, hire Sui Generis attorney Jeff Biederman, and negotiate a long form contract with Epic.  During this time, Atlantic Records also expressed interest in meeting with the band but that interest was held in check by Epic's deal memo and Epic's executive intimations that it would pursue legal action if it lost the band to another label.

In November 2004, the band flew to New York and met with Epic department heads, including head of A&R Ben Goldman, label chief Steve Barnett, head of marketing Lee Stimmel, and radio-promo heads Joel Klaiman and Jacqueline Saturn.  Following that visit, final terms were negotiated and a long form was signed.

When All That's Left Is You is Quietdrive's first LP, produced, engineered and mixed by Matt Kirkwold and James Harley of World Record Productions with additional mixing by Chris Lord-Alge, Mark Endert and Brian King from Burlington Ontario Canada, was released in May 2006. Its first single was "Rise from the Ashes" and was used on Electronic Arts' NHL 07 soundtrack. In 2006, the band released a cover version of the Cyndi Lauper song "Time After Time" to nationwide radio play. The song is also used for the WNBA "Have You Seen Her?" advertising campaign. The song became a minor hit on pop radio, reaching No. 25 on the syndicated American Top 40 countdown show. It was also used on the soundtrack of the 2006 feature film John Tucker Must Die, and in the trailer for the 2008 remake of the film Prom Night.

After the CD release into 2007, the band had a lengthy US tour and was the "Artist of the Month" on Xbox Live in January 2007. Quietdrive, with producers Kirkwold and Harley, released a new single titled "Pretend" on their  AbsolutePunk.net page in early 2007 for fans. Though the band garnered success with Epic Records, in April 2008 they cancelled their contract, partly citing the restricting management of the major music industry.

Quietdrive released their second full-length album Deliverance on October 14, 2008, and supported this album with an extensive tour with announced dates in the US, UK and Japan.

Quietdrive released their EP "Close Your Eyes" independently on October 13, 2009. Their first single was "Jessica". Robby Starbuck produced the music video, which premiered on buzznet.com on December 15, 2009.  Shortly after the release of Close Your Eyes, Matt Kirby decided to leave the band.  In the summer of 2010, bassist Droo Hastings also decided to leave Quietdrive while the band was touring in support of Close Your Eyes.

Matt Kirby left the band due his first child being born. He became the band's manager shortly after. Several guitarists filled in for him at live shows. including Ryan Irey and Jack Swagger (Machine 22).

The band released their self-titled third studio album on December 14, 2010.

In the summer of 2010 Droo Hastings left the band to pursue his own music and he also was expecting his first child. The band didn't make an official announcement at first. They took him off the official members area on Facebook and fans speculated that he had left the band and the band confirmed soon after. Droo still remains good friends with all the members of Quietdrive and frequents their shows in the Twin Cities.

They were looking for a full-time guitarist and bassist to fill Kirby and Droo's positions in the band. Will Caesar auditioned sometime in mid-2010 and Brice Niehaus auditioned for bassist soon after that. They both played in Milwaukee in August 2010 for the first time with the whole band which Will has said was basically their final audition for the band. Soon after that they were both added as official members of Quietdrive on their official Facebook page.

Quietdrive began a fundraising project on Kickstarter, and on July 31, 2011, just two hours before their deadline, the band exceeded their goal of $15,000 to record the cover album "Your Record Our Spin".  The band began recording in October 2011, and intended the album to include 10 songs voted on by fans and one original song. In late December 2011, fans who donated $10 or more via Kickstarter began receiving their copy of the album; the final version only included the ten songs voted on by Kickstarter-donating fans, with an original eleventh track available later for digital download via a password distributed to those who had donated to the fundraising campaign.

On February 1, 2012, Quietdrive released their single "Until the End (Acoustic)" on iTunes, with all proceeds going to the Dean Randazzo Cancer Foundation.  A  music video was released on YouTube that same day, featuring the Grand Nationals, Colin Kassekert and Phil Costa of the Dallas Cowboys.

On April 24, 2012, Quietdrive released their fourth studio album titled Up or Down. Originally it was going to be an eight-song EP that was to be released late 2011 or early 2012. The release was changed to late spring 2012 due to unforeseen circumstances. In the past, Truckenmiller was the primary songwriter but due to Caesar's writing experience in previous jobs him and Truckenmiller cowrote many of the songs on the album.

On October 10, 2012, Bonhiver announced he was leaving the band to pursue other interests

After two years of some touring and time at home they released their fifth studio record The Ghost of What You Used to Be in December 2014. It was originally planned to release it in mid-2014 but they delayed it to December to release it in the U.S. shortly before their annual holiday show.

In December 2014, Caesar quit as a full-time member of Quietdrive but still plays if no one else is available. In 2015 they did not have plans to release another record but still tour occasionally. The members of the band rotate depending on who is available, including previous members Justin Bonhiver, Droo Hastings, and Matt Kirby.

On April 23, 2019, Quietdrive announced that they were reuniting for their first public show in nearly 4 years, and promised "a lot of surprises" over the coming summer and fall.

Band members
The band members occasionally play instruments other than their primary instruments listed below.

Current members
 Kevin Truckenmiller – vocals/acoustic guitar/violin bass (2002–present)
 Brandon Lanier –  drums (2002–present)
 Will Caesar – rhythm guitar/vocals (2010–present)
 Brice Niehaus – bass guitar (2010–present)
 Brady Trudeau –   lead guitar (2012–present)

Former members
 Justin Bonhiver – lead guitar (2002–2012)
 Matt Kirby –  rhythm guitar/vocals (2002–2009), manager (2009–present)
 Droo Hastings – bass guitar (2002–2010)

Timeline

Discography

Studio albums

Compilation albums

Extended plays

Singles

Music videos
 "Rise from the Ashes" (2006), from When All That's Left Is You
 "Jessica" (2009), from Close Your Eyes EP
 "Way Out" (2010), from Quietdrive
 "Until the End (Acoustic Version)" (2011), from Quietdrive
 "Body Out of Bed (feat. Liz Akhavan)" (2013), from Quietdrive
 "Lie to me" (2012), from Up Or Down

Lyric videos
 "Without My Hands" (2014), from The Ghost Of What You Used To Be
 "On My Own" (2015), from The Ghost Of What You Used To Be

Other
 Quietdrive's song "Rise from the Ashes" appeared on the EA Sports NHL 07 Soundtrack.
 Quietdrive's song Time After Time appeared in John Tucker Must Die (2006), Prom Night (2008), and Parks and Recreation (Season 5 episode 16).
 Quietdrive's songs "Kissing Your Lips", "Deliverance", and "Hollywood" appeared on the Xbox 360 snowboarding game soundtrack, STOKED(2009)

References

External links
 Official website at quietdrivemusic.com
 
 Quietdrive on ROCKBANDLOUNGE.COM

Musical groups from Minnesota
American pop punk groups
2002 establishments in Minnesota
Musical groups established in 2002
American punk rock groups
Alternative rock groups from Minnesota